Rhectocraspeda periusalis, the eggplant webworm moth, is a moth in the family Crambidae. It was described by Francis Walker in 1859. It is found in the West Indies and from the United States, where it has been recorded from Florida, North Carolina, Ohio, Oklahoma, South Carolina and Tennessee, south through Mexico and Central America (including Costa Rica, Honduras and Panama) to South America, including Ecuador, Brazil, Guyana, Trinidad and Tobago and Suriname.

The length of the forewings is 8.2-9.7 mm for females and 9.5–10 mm for males. Adults are sexually dimorphic. The wings are brown with blackish transverse lines. Adults have been recorded on wing year-round.

The larvae feed on Capsicum annuum, Nicotiana tabacum, Solanum hirtum, Solanum lycopersicum, Solanum melongena, Solanum nigrum and Solanum torvum. Young larvae either mine the leaves of their host plant or feed on tissue near the leaf's midrib. The mine has the form of an irregular blotch. Older larvae vacate the mine, and either web leaves together or fold over the leaf edges. Young larvae are yellowish, while older larvae are dark brown with two red-brown dorsal stripes and light reddish-brown markings. They reach a length of about 20 mm.

References

Moths described in 1859
Pyraustinae